Cackleberry Airport  is a privately owned, public use airport located five 

nautical miles (6 mi, 9 km) north of the central business district of Dexter, a village in Washtenaw County, Michigan, United States.

Facilities and aircraft 
Cackleberry Airport covers an area of 40 acres (16 ha) at an elevation of 890 feet (271 m) above mean sea level. 

It has one runway, which is designated 6/24 and has a turf surface. It measures 2,113 x 100 ft (644 x 30 m). For the 12-month period ending December 31, 2021, the airport had 100 aircraft operations per year, all general aviation. For the same time period, 2 aircraft are based on the field, both single-engine airplanes.

The airport does not have a fixed-base operator, and no fuel is available.

Accidents and incidents 

 On May 11, 2019, a Cessna 172 Skyhawk snapped in half and folded during takeoff at Cackleberry Airport. The people on board survived with moderate injuries. The pilot reported he took off with 10° of flaps and cleaned up the airplane and trimmed it for normal climb at 75 knots. Engine power was normal at the time. 100' above the ground and 2/3 down the runway, the aircraft decelerated to 65 knots. The pilot leveled the aircraft and reported no stall horn sounded, though he did not notice whether the engine was still running. The pilot verified that the throttle was full open, the mixture was full rich, the carburetor heat was off, and the elevators were in the neutral position, but the airplane continued to decelerate and rapidly descend. In an attempt to level the airplane, he smoothly pulled the yoke aft, but the airplane did not pitch up. The nosewheel impacted the ground, and the airplane nosed over. The probable cause was found to he the airplane's failure to maintain a climb for reasons that could not be determined based on the available evidence.

References

External links 
  at the Michigan Airport Directory
 Aerial image as of April 1998 from USGS The National Map
 

Airports in Michigan
Airports in Washtenaw County, Michigan